The Cupa României is the main knockout competition for Romanian women's basketball teams. It was established in 1965, though it was cancelled in 1970 to 1975, 1978, 1979, 1982 to 1987, 1989 to 1994 and 1996 to 2003. CSM Târgoviște is the most successful club in the competition with nine titles since 2004.

Titles

See also
 Romanian Men's Basketball Cup

References

Romania
Recurring sporting events established in 1965
Women's basketball competitions in Romania